XHVSD-FM is a United States radio station on 97.5 FM in Ciudad Constitución, Baja California Sur.

History
XEVSD-AM 1440 received its concession on January 18, 1971. It was the first radio station in Baja California Sur outside of La Paz.

In 1988, XEVSD was approved to move to 930 kHz, but it never built the facilities and remained on 1440.

XEVSD was authorized to move to FM in February 2011 and moved there in 2012.

References

Radio stations in Baja California Sur
Radio stations established in 1971